James Alvin Jensen (August 2, 1918 – December 14, 1998), was an American paleontologist. His extensive collecting program at Brigham Young University in the Utah-Colorado region which spanned 23 years was comparable in terms of the number of specimens collected to that of Barnum Brown during the early 20th century.  He was given the name "Dinosaur Jim" during the media coverage of his activities. Perhaps his most significant contribution to paleontology was to replace the 19th-century web of external metal struts, straps and posts that had been used to mount dinosaurs with a system of supports which were placed inside of bones, which produced free-standing skeletons with few or no obvious supports.

He is credited with naming and describing Supersaurus (1985) and Torvosaurus (with Peter Galton, 1979).

Life to 1956 
Jensen was born in 1918 in Leamington, Utah and developed an interest as a child exploring the desert and mountains with his father. While working in the now-defunct mining town of Mercur, Utah, he met his future wife, Marie M. Merrell. Neither had finished high school, which limited their options. Casting about for ways to begin their life, they decided to take advantage of the Federal Homestead Act and settled in Seward, Alaska which was still an unpopulated frontier. They married in 1941, and identified the plot of land that they intended to homestead.

However, in anticipation of World War II, the U.S. Army moved into Seward in July, 1941, and started construction on Fort Raymond. The massive influx of military personnel forced many civilians, including them, to return to the "Lower 48". They settled in Salt Lake City, and had two sons. He went through a crash training program on the University of Utah campus to become a machinist and welder. Upon completing the brief program, he received an appointment as a civilian contractor from the federal government, then went to Hanford, WA to work on nuclear "Reactor B" pile of the Manhattan Project, after which he transferred to Pearl Harbor to work in the reconstruction. Jensen returned to Utah in 1945, where he worked at odd jobs such as washing machine repairman, creamery man, truck driver, ceramics, gunsmith, linoleum block printing, sculpting, welder, machinist, taxidermist, inventor, and writer. During this time he met Arnie Lewis who worked at the Utah Field House of Natural History. They became friends and Lewis hired him to mount several birds of prey, later moving to the Museum of Comparative Zoology at Harvard University. In 1951, Jensen and family went to Seward, Alaska where he worked the next five years as a dockside longshoreman.

Artist and sculptor 
As an artist, he worked in most media. His pastel and acrylic paintings, reflecting his love of flowers, landscapes, and his appreciation of American Indians. His painting are hung from Alaska to Florida. In 1972, the Humble Oil Company listed him in a publication of artists of Alaska as one of the best-known pre-WW II artist. He sculpted in stone and metal, honing skills which were useful in developing a new system for mounting dinosaurs.

Harvard University 1956 to 1961 
Alfred Sherwood Romer, Harvard University, hired Jensen in 1956, at the suggestion of Arnie Lewis. He was trained as a preparator in the Department of Vertebrate Paleontology of the Museum of Comparative Zoology. In addition to working on collections and exhibits for several departments, he participated in these collecting expeditions with Romer and Lewis during those five years:

Nova Scotia
Florida - Thomas Farm
Ichigualasto in Argentina, the first of 2 such expeditions
Texas - Boone Ranch
Pennsylvania
Ohio - Clark Hill
Drumheller, Alberta, Canada
West Virginia - Greer Quarry
Montana - Hell Creek
Wyoming - McGrew Ranch

Kronosaurus queenslandicus 

In 1956, Romer decided to mount a Kronosaurus queenslandicus skeleton and had to obtain an unusually large amount of money to do the job. This was because the weight of the final mount was estimated to exceed the carrying capacity of the floor on which it would rest, due to the large amount of steel that would be used in preparing the mount. Therefore, architects drafted plans for a large I-beam to span the entire width of the building. Then two large holes were opened in the external walls and permanent mounts were created on each wall to hold the beam. Cranes then raised and inserted the beam into the holes so that it spanned the entire floor and was then secured to the two mounts. Romer Lewis and Jensen decided how to mount Kronosaurus. Jensen had plans showing how to mount a dinosaur without visible supports. Romer gave his approval to attempt a free standing mount. The plans were modified to suit the actual skeleton and Kronosaurus became the first mount done anywhere without visible structural members.  All supporting bars, beams and sheets of metal and wood were integrated into or behind the bones. In addition to the unique method of concealing structural elements, Jensen used a curved back wall that had no corners to create the trompe d'oeil effect of a floating skeleton. There were no corners, vertical walls, or lines which would create the impression that the Kronosaurus was standing on the floor.

Brigham Young University 1961 - 1984 
When he went to Brigham Young University, he helped develop the Paleontology program. He worked in the field every summer amassing a large collection of packaged bones in matrix. He continued to refine new mounting techniques, prepared specimens, describing some, and attempted unsuccessfully to obtain funding for an earth sciences museum. The bulk of his summer work was done in Western Colorado and Utah. In addition, he went on a second six-month expedition with Harvard University to Ichigualasto, Argentina, and went to Antarctica for three months in an expedition headed up by Ohio State University. His most significant finds in Argentina and Antarctica were the holotype of Probainognathus jenseni on Chañares Formation and a maxilla of a Lystrosaurus on Coalsack Bluff.

Dry Mesa Quarry 
Starting in 1972, because of the remarkable range of species and number of specimens, he focused on Dry Mesa near Delta, in Western Colorado. He did work other locales, but the bulk of his collecting time was spent at Dry Mesa which is probably the richest dinosaur quarry discovered in North America in the second half of the 20th century.

In 1973, Brigham Young University cooperated with producer Steve Linton and director John Linton in order to produce The Great Dinosaur Discovery, a 1-hour-long color documentary showing Jensen's on-site finds in Dry Mesa. First released on November 13, 1973, in local "Egyptian Theater" in Delta, and subsequently aired on several USA TV channels, The Great Dinosaur Discovery was originally planned to be trimmed to about 30 minutes for educational use. Indeed, to obtain a shortened educational version, the full-length documentary was reduced to a 24-minute-long mini-film which started airing on American television channels throughout the US as of 1976.

New dinosaurs 
Following is a list of new species that Jensen described. While the descriptions are sound, his publications reflected his lack of formal training, resulting in errors made in the assignment of sauropod material from Dry Mesa. Caveat all descriptions of Ultrasauros-Ultrasaurus-Supersaurus.

He did not describe all of the new species that were identified as they were collected. Additional new species will be described for Dry Mesa as they are worked out and studied at BYU.

Publications 
Although he didn't complete a formal education, Jensen starting publishing in the "Alaska Sportsman" in 1955, while working as a longshoreman in Seward, Alaska.

Legacy

Free-standing mounts 
The technique for mounting free-standing dinosaurs was developed by Jensen in 1957, while participating in the mount of Kronosaurus queenslandicus.

Plastic foam casting and other experiments
 Because of Jensen's experience in manufacturing, he was aware of techniques, equipment and materials not generally used in museum displays. For example, in 1958, he pioneered the use of a novel industrial product, "rigid foam", for casting dinosaur bones as illustrated by the adjacent photo of an allosaurus skull cast in foam. He worked at the time in the Department of Vertebrate Paleontology, Museum of Comparative Zoology, in the Peabody Museum at Harvard University. By experimenting with an Allosaurus skull he refined the technique and then published his findings in 1961.

Cooperation with rock hounds 
As noted above, part of his success in finding specimens was due to his interest in "rock hounds" who jointly combed thousands of square miles of ground each year. He visited them every year or so, cultivating their friendship with gifts of dinosaur bones in return for information about their latest finds. In several instances, he named new dinosaurs after the person who led him to it.

Education 
Another legacy was Jensen's interest in educating the public about dinosaurs. He enthusiastically educated the public by welcoming them into his quarries each summer.  He received hundreds of letters from school kids and answered them all.  In spite of the fact that BYU denied Jensen a teaching role, he encouraged graduate students to take up the profession. Today, there is a small group of graduate students who became paleontologists as a result of his efforts.

BYU Museum of Paleontology 
The BYU Museum of Paleontology was built around Jensen's collection.

Ankle and foot versus feathers in arboreal life 
Jensen collected "bird" bones in the Dry Mesa Quarry and became interested in the changes necessary for species to move from terrestrial to arboreal life. For him the sine qua non of arboreal life was not feathers. It was the ability of organisms to actually live in trees. This required that they be able to grasp branches, to build nests where they laid eggs and then reared young, and to sleep on small branches for many hours. Feathers don't confer these advantages to the foot or ankle.  He studied ankles and feet of a wide range of mammals including a recently deceased elephant which was brought to him in a refrigerated railroad car, birds, amphibians and any creatures with leg bones and feet. His conclusion was that evolution of the ankle and foot was the fundamental change which had to occur so that species could move permanently, regardless of feathers or not, from the ground into the branches of trees. His research over several years on ankles and feet of various fossil and extant species supported this hypothesis. Ultimately he wrote an article discussing his hypothesis and findings and illustrated it with his own drawings of bones. But out of pique at the time at the world of paleontology, he had the article translated into Japanese and then published it in a Japanese science magazine.

Honorary doctorate 
In 1971, Jensen was granted an honorary doctorate by Brigham Young University.

Selected works
 Jensen, James A. (1981) "A New Oldest Bird?" Anima: 33–39. Tokyo.
 Jensen, James A. (1985) "Uncompahgre dinosaur fauna: a preliminary report," Western North American Naturalist, Vol 45, No 4
 Jensen James A. (2001) The Road to Chilecito, Launceston, Tasmania: Queen Victoria Museum and Art Gallery. , .

Notes

References 
Books
Dinosaur Hunters by Kate McMullan, John R. Jones. New York: Random House, 1989. , .
Terrible Lizard: The First Dinosaur Hunters and the Birth of a New Science by Deborah Cadbury. New York : Holt, 2001. , .
Drawing Out Leviathan: Dinosaurs and the Science Wars by Keith M. Parsons. Bloomington : Indiana University Press, 2001. , 
Time Traveler: In Search of Dinosaurs and Other Fossils from Montana to Mongolia by Michael J. Novacek. New York: Farrar Straus Giroux; Godalming: Melia, 2003. , 
Dinosaurs of Darkness by Thomas H. Rich and Patricia Vickers-Rich. Bloomington: Indiana University Press, 2000. , 

Articles
Ancient Monarch of the Sea, in Natural History Magazine, June 1959, pp. 22–23

News

External links 
 Dinosaur Jim website - Consists of 186 unique URLs and more than 1,000 photos showing all of Jensen's digs while at Harvard University and Brigham Young University including his trip to Antarctica where he found Lystrosaurus.
 Museum Information, BYU Museum of Paleontology, Brigham Young University
 Jensen's entry on the Enchanted Learning site
 Kronosaurus queenslandicus: Ancient Monarch of the Seas
 "What is an Ultrasaurus?"
 Dinosaurs group 'S' on Wordquests
 Dinosaurs group 'T-Z' on Wordquests
 Kozak entry in the  National Anthropological Archives

1918 births
1998 deaths
American paleontologists
Brigham Young University faculty
People from Leamington, Utah